Blacks Creek is a small tributary of Slippery Rock Creek in western Pennsylvania.  The stream rises in southeastern Venango County and flows south entering Slippery Rock Creek near Boyers, Pennsylvania. The watershed is roughly 31% agricultural, 62% forested and the rest is other uses.

References

Rivers of Pennsylvania
Tributaries of the Beaver River
Rivers of Butler County, Pennsylvania
Rivers of Venango County, Pennsylvania